Seye Adelekan (born 15 May 1988), sometimes known mononymously as Seye, is a Nigerian British bassist, musician and singer-songwriter, best known as the live bassist for Gorillaz since 2017.

Early life
Seye Adelekan was born in Nigeria to a father who worked in the oil industry. He grew up in Lagos, Netherlands, Ecuador and south-east London.

Career
Seye's music career began in 2007. In 2012 Seye released his debut solo single "White Noise".

Seye toured with Lana Del Rey, Emeli Sandé and worked as session musician for Paloma Faith, before joining Gorillaz in 2017. He has a tattoo of a dove (Spanish paloma) as a tribute to Faith.

Personal life
Seye's brother Olugbenga Adelekan is also a professional musician best known as the bassist for the band Metronomy.

References

External links

1988 births
21st-century Irish people
Living people
Musicians from London
English rock bass guitarists
21st-century English bass guitarists
Male bass guitarists
English people of Yoruba descent
Gorillaz members
English session musicians